Tomáš Franta (born 18 April 1998) is a Czech swimmer. He competed in the men's 50 metre backstroke event at the 2018 FINA World Swimming Championships (25 m), in Hangzhou, China. In 2019, he represented the Czech Republic at the 2019 World Aquatics Championships in Gwangju, South Korea.

References

1998 births
Living people
Czech male swimmers
Male backstroke swimmers
Place of birth missing (living people)
Swimmers at the 2015 European Games
European Games competitors for the Czech Republic